Göründü is a village in the Arıcak District of Elazığ Province in Turkey. Its population is noted to be 66 (2021). The village is mostly populated by the Kurds.

References

Villages in Arıcak District
Kurdish settlements in Elazığ Province